Çatalçam is a village in Mardin Province in southeastern Turkey. It is located in the district of Dargeçit and the historical region of Tur Abdin. The village is populated by Assyrians and had population of 33 in 2021.

In the village, there are churches of Mor Aho, the Cross, Mor Heworo, and Mor Barsawmo.

Etymology
The Syriac name of the village is derived from "dayro" ("monastery" in Syriac) and "Slibo" ("cross" in Syriac), thus Dayro da-Slibo translates to "Monastery of the Cross". The village's alternative name, the Monastery of Beth El, is composed of "beth" ("house" in Syriac) and "El" ("God" in Syriac), and therefore translates to "Monastery of the House of God".

History
The foundation of the monastery, that would later become a village, is attributed to Saint Aho the Solitary in the 6th century, but it is suggested that it was founded earlier. The monastery was named after a piece of the True Cross that Saint Aho brought back from Constantinople. Saint Gabriel of Beth Qustan is alleged to have resurrected the abbot of the monastery in the 7th century. Dayro da-Slibo is first mentioned in 774, in which year many monks there died from plague. Bishop Sovo of Tur Abdin is attested at the monastery before 790. In 1088, after the division of the diocese of Tur Abdin into the sees of Qartmin and Hah, Dayro da-Slibo became the seat of the bishops of Hah. Masud of Zaz, who later became Patriarch of Tur Abdin, was abbot of the monastery from c. 1462/1463 until his ordination as bishop of Ḥesno d'Kifo in 1480/1481.

In the mid-19th century, the monastery became a village, and roughly 20 Assyrian families inhabited Dayro da-Slibo in 1892. Dayro da-Slibo was populated by 400 Assyrians in 1914; the Assyrian genocide in the following year resulted in many deaths, including Antimus Yaʿqub of Esfes, the last Bishop of Dayro da-Slibo. 70 Assyrians were later killed by Kurds in the aftermath of the genocide. During the Sheikh Said rebellion, in 1925-1926, Kurdish rebels used Dayro da-Slibo as a military base. The villagers found shelter in nearby caves whilst the village was damaged by Turkish aerial bombardment. In 1967, 88 Assyrians populated Dayro da-Slibo, however, the population declined as villagers emigrated to Germany, Sweden, the Netherlands, and Australia as a consequence of the Kurdish–Turkish conflict.

On 2 August 1992, the cemetery and villagers' houses were destroyed, and its population forcibly evacuated by the Turkish army. Villagers later returned and by 2000, the village was inhabited by 13 people. On 17 July 2004, Gevriye Arslan, the village mukhtar, was murdered by Kurds after he refused to transfer to them the land of a Christian woman who had been kidnapped and forced to convert to Islam. Dayro da-Slibo was inhabited by 2 Assyrian families in 2013. A land dispute over the seizure of villagers' land by a neighbouring Kurdish clan that began in 2008 was not resolved until 2015 due to the Kurds' threat of violence. The Kurds were dislodged from the Assyrians' land by a large Turkish military force accompanied by military helicopters.

References
Notes

Citations

Bibliography

Assyrian communities in Turkey
Tur Abdin
Villages in Dargeçit District
Places of the Assyrian genocide